Worlds Beyond is a British television anthology series based on real-life supernatural experiences described in archival documents from the Society for Psychical Research that was broadcast on ITV from 1986 to 1988. A book was also released to accompany the series.

Episode list
 The Haunted Garden
 Serenade for Dead Lovers
 The Barrington Case
 Captain Randolph
 The Black Tomb
 Home
 Voice of the Gallows
 The Eye of Yemanja
 Guardian of the Past
 Suffer Little Children
 Undying Love
 Reflections of Evil
 Oliver's Ghost

References

External links
Haunted TV, 1980–1989
Worlds Beyond at the BFI Film & TV Database

British supernatural television shows
1986 British television series debuts
1988 British television series endings
1980s British anthology television series
Television shows shot at EMI-Elstree Studios
ITV television dramas
English-language television shows
British fantasy television series
Television shows produced by Thames Television